Judy Congdon (born 3 December 1948) is a British former professional tennis player.

Congdon, who studied at Millfield, is a native of Exeter in Devon.

A two-time British junior champion, Congdon was girls' singles runner-up to Birgitta Lindström at the 1966 Wimbledon Championships and featured in the Wimbledon women's singles main draw three times. In the qualifying rounds of the 1971 Wimbledon Championships she played in the tournament's first ever tiebreak.

References

External links
 
 

1948 births
Living people
British female tennis players
English female tennis players
Tennis people from Devon
People educated at Millfield